Real-world evidence (RWE) in medicine is the clinical evidence regarding the usage and potential benefits or risks of a medical product derived from analysis of real-world data (RWD). RWE can be generated by different study designs or analyses, including but not limited to, randomized trials, including large simple trials, pragmatic trials, and retrospective or prospective observational studies. In the USA the 21st Century Cures Act required the FDA to expand the role of real world evidence.
 
Real-world evidence comes into play when clinical trials cannot really account for the entire patient population of a particular disease. Patients with comorbidities or belonging to a distant geographic region or age limit who did not participate in any clinical trial may not respond to the treatment in question as expected. RWE provides answers to these problems and also to analyze effects of drugs over a longer period of time. Pharmaceutical companies and health insurance payers study RWE to understand patient pathways to deliver appropriate care for appropriate individuals and to minimize their own financial risk by investing on drugs that work for patients.

Data quality 
In order to use real-world data to generate evidence, data must be of sufficient quality. Kahn et al. define data quality as consisting of three components: (1) conformance (do data values adhere to do specified standard and formats?; subtypes: value, relational and computational conformance);  (2) completeness (are data values present?); and (3) plausibility (are data values believable?; subtypes uniqueness, atemporal; temporal).

Fitness for purpose 
Similarly to having sufficient data quality, the real-world data must be fit for purpose. An RWD resource can be fit for addressing some questions, but not others. For example, a dataset that lacks mother-to-baby links may not be appropriate to address drug risk for fetus but can be used for questions for drug safety in patients taking epilepsy treatment (limited to the patient; not including safety for fetus). Since data quality can be evaluated outside a particular purpose (on a general level), fitness for purpose is evaluated separate from data quality and is not included in the concept of data quality.

See also 
 Correlation does not imply causation
 Evidence-based medicine
 Levels of evidence
 Pragmatic clinical trial
 Qualitative research
 Quantitative research

References 

 Real-World Evidence — What Is It and What Can It Tell Us? The New England Journal of Medicine, December 6, 2016
 Real World Evidence, FDA, June 21, 2018.
 Mahajan, Rajiv. “Real World Data: Additional Source for Making Clinical Decisions.” International Journal of Applied and Basic Medical Research 5.2 (2015): 82. PMC. Web. 5 May 2018.
 Berger, Marc L. et al. “Good Practices for Real‐world Data Studies of Treatment And/or Comparative Effectiveness: Recommendations from the Joint ISPOR‐ISPE Special Task Force on Real‐world Evidence in Health Care Decision Making.” Pharmacoepidemiology and Drug Safety 26.9 (2017): 1033–1039. PMC. Web. 5 May 2018.

External links 
 "Real World Evidence" at FDA
 "21st Century Cures Act"
 "Use of Real World Data in Development Programmes" at EMA
 "Observational Health Data Sciences and Informatics"
 "Need for Real World Evidence"
 "Real-world evidence: From activity to impact in healthcare decision making"

Evidence
Health informatics
Clinical research